The 2016–17 Kansas State Wildcats men's basketball team represented Kansas State University in the 2016–17 NCAA Division I men's basketball season. Their head coach was Bruce Weber in his fifth year at the helm of the Wildcats. The team played its home games in Bramlage Coliseum in Manhattan, its home court since 1988. They were a member of the Big 12 Conference. They finished the season 21–14, 8–10 in Big 12 play to finish in sixth place. They defeated Baylor in the quarterfinals of the Big 12 tournament to advance to the semifinals where they lost to West Virginia. They received an at-large bid to the NCAA tournament where they defeated Wake Forest in the First Four to advance to the First Round where they lost to Cincinnati.

Preseason
The Wildcats finished the 2015–16 season 17–16, 5–13 in Big 12 play to finish in eighth place. They defeated Oklahoma State in the first round of the Big 12 tournament to advance to the quarterfinals where they lost to Kansas.

Departures

Class of 2016 recruits

Roster

Schedule and results

|-
!colspan=12 style=| Exhibition
|-

|-
!colspan=12 style="| Regular season

|-
!colspan=12 style=| Big 12 tournament

|-
! colspan=9 style="background:#;"| NCAA tournament

Rankings

*AP does not release post-NCAA tournament rankings

See also
 2016–17 Kansas State Wildcats women's basketball team

References

Kansas State Wildcats men's basketball seasons
Kansas State
2016 in sports in Kansas
2017 in sports in Kansas
Kansas State